Adam's fountain is a public display fountain in Charring cross, Ooty. It was built in 1886 as a memorial to a Governor of Ooty, who was very famous in the region during his tenure. The total cost of finishing the fountain was between Rs. 13,000 to Rs. 14000, which was funded through public funding.

History

The fountain was originally planned to be placed near the Ooty market. But it was decided later that the site in front of the District collector's office in Ooty was a better place as it had higher number of passers by. After building the fountain, it was discovered that the site did not have the necessary water head for the fountain to function properly. It was finally moved to its present location in Charring cross in 1898. An old melanoxylon tree which stood in the site of the present location of the fountain, which was considered as a landmark in Charring cross was removed for the construction of the fountain.

Tourist attraction
As the fountain is located in one of the most important and beautiful places in Ooty, it is an important tourist landmark in the Ooty town.

See also
 Ooty Lake
 Stone House, Ooty
 Mariamman temple, Ooty
 Ooty Golf Course
 St. Stephen's Church, Ooty

References

Tourist attractions in Ooty
Fountains in India